San Cristóbal Airport  is an airport on the island of San Cristóbal, in the Galápagos Islands of Ecuador. The airport is on the southwestern end of the island, with rising terrain to the northeast. Approaches to both runways are over the ocean.

The San Cristobal non-directional beacon (Ident: SCR) and VOR-DME (Ident: SCV) are located on the field.

In June 2019, the Ecuadorian government gave permission for the US military to use the airfield as a base, leading to widespread outcry.

Airlines and destinations

Statistics

See also

Transport in Ecuador
List of airports in Ecuador

References

External links

OpenStreetMap - San Cristóbal
OurAirports - San Cristóbal
SkyVector - San Cristóbal

Airports in Ecuador
Buildings and structures in Galápagos Province
Puerto Baquerizo Moreno